Century Apartments, also known as the T.L. Ritchey Apartments, is a historic apartment building located at St. Joseph, Missouri.  It was built in 1926, and is a three-story, "U"-shaped, Mission Revival style buff brick and terra cotta building.  It features a large central courtyard, polychromatic brickwork, and quatrefoil windows.

It was listed on the National Register of Historic Places in 2001.

References

Residential buildings on the National Register of Historic Places in Missouri
Mission Revival architecture in Missouri
Residential buildings completed in 1926
Residential buildings in St. Joseph, Missouri
National Register of Historic Places in Buchanan County, Missouri